Tara Devi temple is one of the most visited religious places in Shimla. It is installed at a height of 7200 feet above sea level and situated around 11 km away from Shimla city. There is a Shiv temple Shiv Bavdi nearby.

History 
Tara Devi temple was built by Sen dynasty kings sometime around 1766 A.D. The fort of Giri Sen is still there in Junga.

According to a story which traces back to 250 years, the king Bhupendra Sen built the temple and after he had a vision in which Goddess Tara Devi asked him to install a template there so that people could get her blessings. He also installed a wooden statue of Goddess there.

Later, King Balbir Sen had a vision of Goddess Tara where she asked him to install the temple on Tarav hill top. The king did the same and also erected an idol of Goddess made up of “Ashtadhatu”,  a mix of eight precious elements. The idol was carried on an element named Shankar.

The Name Tara 
Tara Goddess in Hinduism and Buddhism is second of the Ten Great Wisdoms called ‘Mahavidyas’ and is known to be a source of all energies. The word ‘Tara’ is derived from Sanskrit root ‘tr’, which means to cross. The word ‘tara’ also means star in many Indian languages.

Surrounding 
The  template has the backdrop of the Himalayas. There are forests on one side and roads on another.

Gallery

Beliefs 
It is believed that Goddess Tara was brought to the lap of Himalayas in Himachal from West Bengal in the 18th century. According to some people, being the Goddess of stars, she watches over everyone from the skies and showers her blessings.

Reconstruction 
The temple was rebuilt in 2018 after three and a half years of work and at a cost of over ₹6 crore. The wood carving on the temple is kept as close to original ‘pahari’ style. Precious metals like gold and silver were also used in the decoration. The statue of Tara Devi was also installed on 20 July 2018 in the presence of 90 priests. Idols of Saraswati and Kali are also installed in the temple.

Some other highlights 
There is a temple of Batuk Bhairav nearby. The milestone gate is 2.5 km away. People who want to organize religious feast wait for 6 years for their turn.

Celebrations in Tara Devi Mandir 
During festivals like Dussehra and Durga Ashtami, a huge feast is arranged which is attended by a large number of devotees. It becomes very difficult to visit the temple during snowfall and rainy season.

Visitors Count 
The temple is open for visit from 7 AM to 6:30 PM on all days. It takes around 2 hours to visit the place. Around 12000 to 15000 devotees visit the temple on weekends and there is no entry fee.

Nearby attractions 
Below are some of the main attractions nearby in Shimla:

Annadale
 Dorje Drak Monastery / TDAC Nyingmapa Monastery
Vice Regal Lodge
Jakhoo Temple / Jakhoo Hill
Kali Bari Temple
The Mall
 Christ Church
The Ridge
 Kalka - Shimla Railway
Kufri

References 

Shimla district
Tourist attractions in Shimla
Temples in Shimla
Hindu temples in Himachal Pradesh